Ken is a masculine given name of Scottish / Scottish Gaelic origin. It is used either as a given name or as a short form of names with the letters "Ken" (like Kenneth, Kenan, Kendrick, Kendall, Kennedy, Mackenzie, Kenson, or Kenelm). Ken is also a Japanese name which can have many different meanings depending on the kanji used.

People 
 Ken (musician) (born 1968), Japanese musician and member of the bands L'Arc-en-Ciel and Sons of All Pussys
 , Japanese author
 Ken Anderson (quarterback) (born 1949), American quarterback
 Ken Anderson (wrestler) (born 1976), American professional wrestler known under the ring name Mr. Kennedy
 Ken Barrie (1933–2016), English voice actor and singer
 Ken Block (disambiguation), multiple people
 Ken Bowersox (born 1956), astronaut
 Ken Bruce (born 1951), Scottish DJ
 Ken Buesseler (born 1959), American marine radiochemist
 Ken Burns (born 1953), American documentary filmmaker
 Ken Caminiti (1963–2004), Major League Baseball player
 Ken Campbell (1941–2008), English writer, actor, and director
 Ken Campbell (evangelist) (1934–2006), Canadian evangelist
 Ken Casey, bassist of the Boston Irish punk rock group Dropkick Murphys
 Ken Chan (Filipino actor) (born 1993), Filipino actor
 Ken Christianson, California based artist and musician, with art collective Elephant Empire
 Ken Clark (actor) (1927–2009), American actor
 Ken Davitian (born 1953), American film and TV actor
 Ken Dodd (1927–2018), English comedian
 Ken Doherty (born 1969), Irish professional snooker player, commentator and radio presenter
 Ken Dyer (1946–2010), American football player
 Ken Dryden (born 1947), Canadian politician, lawyer, businessman, author, and former NHL goaltender
 Ken Flax (born 1963), American Olympic hammer thrower
 Ken Follett (born 1949), British author of thrillers and historical novels
 Ken Giles (born 1990), American baseball player
 Ken Griffey Sr. (born 1950), American baseball player
 Ken Griffey Jr. (born 1969), American baseball player
 Ken Ham (born 1951), Australian-born American creationist
 Ken Harrelson (born 1941), Major League Baseball player and broadcaster
 Ken Harris (1898–1982), American animator
 Ken Hendricks, billionaire (1941–2007), president of Hendricks Group
 Ken Hirai (born 1972), J-pop singer known for the hit songs "Hitomi wo Tojite" and "POP STAR"
 Ken Hoang (born 1985), American professional electronic sports player
 Ken Holtzman (born 1945), American Major League Baseball pitcher
 , Japanese comedian
 Ken Hughes (1922–2001), writer and director of films, including Chitty Chitty Bang Bang
 Ken Jennings (born 1974), contestant, exexutive producer and host of the game show Jeopardy!
 Ken Jeong (born 1969), American comedian, actor and former physician
 Ken Kelley (American football) (born 1960), American football player
 Ken Kelley (journalist) (1949–2008), American journalist and publisher
 Ken Kesey (1935–2001), novelist, author of One Flew Over the Cuckoo's Nest
 Ken Kirby, Canadian-born actor and screenwriter
 Ken Klippenstein, American journalist
 Ken Kratz (born 1960–61), American lawyer, former district attorney of Calumet County, Wisconsin; law license was suspended for four months after sexting scandal
 Ken Kutaragi (born 1950), President and CEO, later Chairman, of Sony Computer Entertainment
 Ken Kwaku (born 1946), Ghanaian corporate governance expert
 Ken Lay (1942–2006), CEO and Chairman of Enron
 Ken Labanowski (born 1959), American-Israeli basketball player
 Ken Livingstone, politician (born 1945), former mayor of London, UK
 Ken Lloyd (born 1976), Japanese-British musician, vocalist and songwriter of Fake? and Oblivion Dust
 Ken Loach (born 1936), British film director
 Ken Lutz (born 1965), American football player
 Ken Matthews (disambiguation), multiple people
 Ken McAlister (born 1960), American football player
 Ken McCarthy (born 1959), American activist, educator, entrepreneur and Internet commercialization pioneer
 Ken McCarty (born 1958), American politician
 Ken MacLeod (born 1954), Scottish science fiction writer
 Ken McElroy (1934–1981), American unsolved murder victim and criminal
 Ken Messer (1931–2018), British painter
 Ken Miyagishima (born 1963), American mayor
 , Japanese freestyle skier
 Ken Morrish (1919–2006), former mayor of the city of Scarborough, Ontario, Canada
 Ken Morrison (born 1931), English supermarket CEO
 Ken Murray (disambiguation), multiple people
 Ken Nomura (born 1965), member of the drifting motorsport scene and of the D1 Grand Prix series
 , Japanese car designer, creative director of Pininfarina, professor
 Ken Parrish (born 1984), American football player
 Ken Penders, American comic book writer
 Ken Pettway (born 1964), American player of gridiron football
 Ken Pogue (1934–2015), Canadian actor 
 Ken Ring (rapper) (born 1979), Swedish rapper
 Ken Robinson (disambiguation), multiple people
 Ken Rosewall (born 1934), Grand Slam tennis champion
 Ken Rush (1931–2011), former NASCAR Cup Series driver
 Ken Russell (1927–2011), film director and actor
 Ken Rutherford (cricketer) (born 1965), New Zealand cricketer
 Ken Saro-Wiwa (1941–1995), writer and political activist
 Ken Schrader (born 1955), NASCAR driver
 Ken Shamrock (born 1964), American mixed martial artist and retired professional wrestler
 , Japanese comedian, member of the Drifters
 , Japanese male adult video (AV) actor
 Ken Singleton (born 1947), American Major League Baseball player and commentator
 Ken Sio (born 1990), Australian Rugby League player
 Ken Smollen, Chairman of the Irish Democratic Party
 Ken Spears (born 1938), American cartoonist and film producer
 Ken Spikes (1935–2009), former NASCAR Cup Series driver
 Ken Spreitzer, computer programmer
 Ken Stott (born 1954), Scottish actor
 , Japanese illustrator known for his work on the Pokémon video games
 , Japanese film actor
 Ken Terrell (1904–1966), actor and stuntman
 Ken Thaiday Snr (born 1950), Torres Strait Islander/Australian artist 
 Ken Thompson (born 1943), American computer scientist and one of the primary creators of Unix
 Ken Tyrrell (1924–2001), founder of the Formula One team Tyrrell Racing
 Ken Uehara (1909–1991), Japanese film actor
 Ken Wahl (born 1954), American actor
 Ken Waldichuk (born 1998), American baseball player
 , Japanese comedian and television presenter
 , Japanese theater, TV, and film actor
 Ken Webster (disambiguation), multiple people
 Ken Whyld (1926–2003), British chess player and author
 Ken Winey (born 1962), Canadian football player
 Ken Zheng (born 1995), Indonesian actor, screenwriter and martial artist

Fictional characters 
, a character in Persona 3
Ken (Barbie) also known as Ken Carson, toy doll
Ken Barlow, character in the British TV soap opera Coronation Street
Ken Cosgrove, a fictional character in the US television series, Mad Men
 or Ken, hero of the manga and anime series Fist of the North Star
 or Ken, main character of the manga and anime series Rurouni Kenshin
, a character in the Juken Sentai Gekiranger
, a character in Chikyu Sentai Fiveman
, a character in the anime series Digimon
Ken Joshima (城島 犬), a character in the anime series Reborn!
, main character of the manga and anime series Tokyo Ghoul
, a character in Initial D
Ken Marks, a character in 1993 action/martial arts movie Showdown
, character in the Street Fighter video games
, a character in the anime series Beyblade Burst
, character in the anime series Machine Robo Rescue
Ken Ryuguji also known as Draken, character in the anime series Tokyo Revenger
Ken Murphy, a character in the 2009 American romantic comedy-drama movie He's Just Not That Into You, Daphne Zuniga
Ken Rosenberg, a character in the Grand Theft Auto video games
Ultraman Ken, better known as Father of Ultra, from the Ultraman Series; true name revealed in the film Mega Monster Battle: Ultra Galaxy Legend

See also 
 Ken (disambiguation)
 Kenneth
 Kenny (disambiguation)

English masculine given names
Japanese masculine given names
Masculine given names
Hypocorisms